SOCOG may refer to:

 Sydney Organising Committee for the Olympic Games, for the 2000 Summer Olympics
 Sochi 2014 Olympic and Paralympic Organizing Committee, for the 2014 Winter Olympics